Cindy Silvestre (born 12 February 1993) is a French kickboxer and Nak Muay, who has been professionally competing since 2015.

She is the former ISKA World K-1 champion, two time FFKMDA Muay Thai champion, ICO European and Intercontinental Muay Thai champion, as well as WMO, AFSO and IMTF World champion.

At the amateur level, she was the five time national junior kickboxing and one time senior champion, and two time national amateur muay thai champion.

Cindy started combat sports with full-contact, a discipline where she holds a title of semi-pro French champion.

She started muay-thai in 2016, and that same year she won her first world title in the under 57kg category in Thailand, and kept it the following year.

In 2022, his record is 7 world titles in muay-thai and 1 world title in K-11.

She boxes all over the world; his professional record, in 2022, is 75 victories in 114 fights.

She boxed on the Glory, Enfusion and SuperChamp circuits, Muay-Thai Hardcore, Lumpinee, Thai Fight.

Nicknamed French Cyborg, she has an aggressive and powerful fighting style.

Championships and accomplishments
Fédération Française de Kick Boxing, Muaythaï et Disciplines Associées
FFKMDA National Muay Thai Championship -56 kg (Two times)
International Combat Organization
ICO European Muay Thai Championship -53.5 kg
ICO Intercontinental Muay Thai Championship -60 kg
International Sport Karate Association
ISKA World K-1 Bantamweight Championship -54 kg
World Muaythai Organization
WMO World Championship (Two times) -57 and 54 kg
All Fight System Organization
AFSO World Muay Thai Championship -53.5 kg
International Muaythai Federation
 IMTF World Championship -51 kg

Fight record

|-  style="background:#cfc;
| 2022-04-23 || Win ||align=left| Sundania || Lumpinee Stadium || Bangkok, Thailand || Decision || 5 || 3:00
|-  style="background:#cfc;
| 2022-03-05 || Win ||align=left| PetchJaras Btu || Muay Hardcore || Phuket, Thailand || KO || 2 || 
|-  style="background:#fbb;"
| 2021-12-18 || Loss ||align=left| Phayasingh Phuket Singha Muay || Muay Hardcore || Phuket, Thailand || Decision || 5 || 3:00
|-  style="background:#cfc;"
| 2021-10-16 || Win ||align=left| Melissa Bounoua || Fighting Edition || Valenciennes, France || Decision || 3 || 3:00
|-  style="background:#cfc;"
| 2021-10-02 || Win ||align=left| Ines El Salemy || Empire Fight || Montbéliard, France || Decision || 5 || 3:00
|-  style="background:#fbb;"
| 2021-09-11 || Loss ||align=left| Teodora Kirilova || Pro Fight 18 || Dupnitsa, Bulgaria || Decision || 3 || 3:00
|-  style="background:#cfc;"
| 2021-08-21 || Win ||align=left| Aline Seiberth || Fight Time || Recherswil, Switzerland || Decision || 3 || 3:00
|- style="background:#fbb;"
| 2021-07-04 ||Loss||align=left| Phetjee Jaa Or.Meekun  || THAI FIGHT Strong, Queen’s Cup Flyweight tournament - Semifinal || Pattaya, Thailand || KO || 2 ||
|-  style="background:#cfc;"
| 2020-3-7|| Win ||align=left| Thanonchanok Gilalampang || Warriors Fight 2 || Chartres, France || Decision (Unanimous) || 3 || 3:00
|-  style="background:#cfc;"
| 2020-2-11|| Win ||align=left| Saw Mueng Chang || Real Fight || Bangkok, Thailand || KO || 2 ||
|-  style="background:#fbb;"
| 2020-2-2 || Loss ||align=left| Nanghong Liangprasert || Super Champ || Bangkok, Thailand || Decision (Unanimous) || 3 || 3:00
|-  style="background:#fbb;"
| 2019-12-7 || Loss ||align=left| Lena Ovchynnikova || LVIV Open Cup || Lviv, Ukraine || Decision (Unanimous) || 5 || 2:00 
|-
! style=background:white colspan=9 |
|-  style="background:#fbb;"
| 2019-11-9 || Loss ||align=left| Ines Pilutti || Lion Belt 7 || Belfort, France || Decision (Majority) || 3 || 3:00 
|-
! style=background:white colspan=9 |
|-  style="background:#cfc;"
| 2019-11-9 || Win ||align=left| Erica Gatti || Lion Belt 7 || Belfort, France || Decision (Unanimous) || 3 || 3:00 
|-
! style=background:white colspan=9 |
|-  style="background:#fbb;"
| 2019-10-12 || Loss ||align=left| Iman Barlow || A Night Of Muay Thai || Melton Mowbray, United Kingdom || TKO (Doctor stoppage) || 3 ||
|-  style="background:#cfc;"
| 2019-9-9 || Win ||align=left| Hara Dimitroula || Enfusion 87 || Darmstadt, Germany || Decision (Unanimous) || 3 || 3:00
|-  style="background:#fbb;"
| 2019-8-3 || Loss ||align=left| Grace Spicer || Capital Punishment || Southampton, England || Decision (Unanimous) || 5 || 2:00 
|-
! style=background:white colspan=9 |
|-  style="background:#cfc;"
| 2019-6-29 || Win ||align=left| Roberta Sarcinella || Tournoi du Sor Sitkongnoï || Jonzac, France || Decision (Unanimous) || 3 || 3:00
|-  style="background:#fbb;"
| 2019-6-8 || Loss ||align=left| Amy Pirnie || Blackpool Rebellion || Blackpool, England || TKO || 3 ||
|-  style="background:#fbb;"
| 2019-5-4 || Loss ||align=left| Sophie Hawkswell || Johnny T’s And Paul Bates Show || Prestwich, England || TKO || 4 ||
|-  style="background:#cfc;"
| 2019-4-13 || Win ||align=left| Amandine Lambour || Enfusion 82 || Orchies, France || TKO || 3 ||
|-  style="background:#cfc;"
| 2019-3-20 || Win ||align=left| Supphanika Tanchoem || 15th International Thai Martial Arts Festival 2019 || Ayutthaya, Thailand || Decision (Unanimous) || 3 || 3:00 
|-
! style=background:white colspan=9 |
|-  style="background:#cfc;"
| 2019-3-18 || Win ||align=left| Maria Phoumdom || 15th International Thai Martial Arts Festival 2019 || Ayutthaya, Thailand || TKO || 1 ||
|-  style="background:#fbb;"
| 2019-3-16 || Loss ||align=left| ? || WMO World Championship || Bangkok, Thailand || Decision (Unanimous) || 3 || 3:00
|-  style="background:#fbb;"
| 2018-11-24 || Loss ||align=left| Delphine Guénon || Superfight Boxing Art Tournament || Clichy, France || Decision (Unanimous) || 3 || 3:00
|-  style="background:#fbb;"
| 2018-10-20 || Loss ||align=left| Sofia Olofsson || Glory 60: Lyon || Lyon, France || Decision (Unanimous) || 3 || 3:00
|-  style="background:#cfc;"
| 2018-9-22 || Win ||align=left| Laura Torre || Bodensee Fightnight VI || Pfullendorf, Germany || Decision (Unanimous) || 3 || 3:00 
|-
! style=background:white colspan=9 |
|-  style="background:#fbb;"
| 2018-7-1 || Loss ||align=left| Georgina van der Linden || Ubeda Future Champs || Úbeda, Spain || Decision (Unanimous) || 3 || 3:00
|-  style="background:#fbb;"
| 2018-6-16 || Loss ||align=left| Elna Nilsson || Queen of the Ring 3 || Lund, Sweden || Decision (Unanimous) || 5 || 3:00 
|-
! style=background:white colspan=9 |
|-  style="background:#cfc;"
| 2018-4-14 || Win ||align=left| Arij Zaafouri || United Siam Fight || Le Mans, France || TKO (Corner Stoppage) || 4 || 3:00
|-  style="background:#fbb;"
| 2018-4-7 || Loss ||align=left| Atenea Flores Pertegas || CPI Fight Night || Donauwörth, Germany || Decision (Unanimous) || 3 || 3:00
|-  style="background:#cfc;"
| 2018-3-31 || Win ||align=left| Carina Greimel  || Kick Boxing || Bar-le-Duc, France || Decision (Unanimous) || 3 || 3:00
|-  style="background:#cfc;"
| 2018-3-21 || Win ||align=left| Tchai Xnong || International & Thai Martial Arts Games And Festival || Bangkok, Thailand || Decision (Unanimous) || 5 || 3:00 
|-
! style=background:white colspan=9 |
|-  style="background:#fbb;"
| 2018-1-27 || Loss ||align=left| Ella Grapperhaus || Power Women || Amsterdam, Netherlands || Decision (Split) || 5 || 3:00
|-  style="background:#fbb;"
| 2018-1-20 || Loss ||align=left| Viktoria Lipianska || Siam Fight 3 || Terville, France || Decision (Majority) || 3 || 3:00
|-  style="background:#fbb;"
| 2017-12-15 || Loss ||align=left| Patricia Axling || Ladies Fight Night 7: Double Trouble 1 || Łódź, Poland || Decision (Unanimous) || 3 || 3:00
|-  style="background:#fbb;"
| 2017-12-2 || Loss ||align=left| Atenea Flores Pertegas || ? || Vaals, Netherlands || Decision (Unanimous) || 3 || 3:00
|-  style="background:#cfc;"
| 2017-11-4 || Win ||align=left| Barbara Ruffolo || Spirit Boxing Show 2 || Aube, France || Decision (Split) || 3 || 3:00
|-  style="background:#fbb;"
| 2017-10-30 || Loss ||align=left| Chiara Vincis || ? || Loano, Italy || Decision (Unanimous) || 3 || 3:00
|-  style="background:#cfc;"
| 2017-6-3 || Win ||align=left| Fanny Foures ||  || Cavalaire, France || Decision (Unanimous) || 3 || 3:00
|-  style="background:#fbb;"
| 2017-5-20 || Loss ||align=left| Myriame Djedidi || La Nuit De L’Impact III || Saintes, France || Decision (Unanimous) || 3 || 3:00
|-  style="background:#cfc;"
| 2017-4-24 || Win ||align=left| Tamara Platter || CPI Fight Night || Donauwörth, Germany || KO || 3 ||  
|-
! style=background:white colspan=9 |
|-  style="background:#cfc;"
| 2017-3-20 || Win ||align=left| Anlay S. Somglenkun || ? || Bangkok, Thailand || Decision (Overturned) || 3 || 3:00
|-
! style=background:white colspan=9 |
|-  style="background:#fbb;"
| 2017-3-4 || Loss ||align=left| Ruth Ashdown || Pantheon Fight Series: Imperium || Hastings, England || Decision (Unanimous) || 3 || 3:00
|-  style="background:#cfc;"
| 2016-10-30 || Win ||align=left| Antonella Zizzi || ? || Ariccia, Italy || Decision (Unanimous) || 5 || 3:00
|-
! style=background:white colspan=9 |
|-  style="background:#cfc;"
| 2016-5-7 || Win ||align=left| January Wynne || ? || Rome, Italy || Decision (Unanimous) || 5 || 3:00
|-
! style=background:white colspan=9 |
|-  style="background:#cfc;"
| 2016-5-7 || Win ||align=left| Sumanthar Baenkham || ? || Bangkok, Thailand || Decision (Unanimous) || 5 || 3:00
|-
! style=background:white colspan=9 |
|-
| colspan=9 | Legend:

See also
 List of female kickboxers

References

French female kickboxers

1993 births
Living people
Sportspeople from Besançon